China is a hamlet in Delaware County, New York, United States. It is located north-northeast of Deposit on China Road at its intersection with  Schofield Road. Cold Spring Creek flows south through the hamlet.

References

Geography of Delaware County, New York
Hamlets in Delaware County, New York
Hamlets in New York (state)